Karel Snoeckx (born 29 October 1973) is a retired Belgian football player.

Honours 
Lierse SK

 Belgian First Division: 1996–97
 Belgian Super Cup: 1999

Beerschot A.C

 Belgian Cup: 2004–05

References

External links
 Profile & stats – Lierse
 Profile & stats – Lokeren

1973 births
Living people
Sportspeople from Turnhout
Belgian footballers
Belgium international footballers
Lierse S.K. players
K.S.C. Lokeren Oost-Vlaanderen players
Vålerenga Fotball players
Beerschot A.C. players
K.S.K. Beveren players
Belgian expatriate footballers
Expatriate footballers in Norway
Eliteserien players
Belgian Pro League players
Association football midfielders
Hoogstraten VV players
Footballers from Antwerp Province